The women's slalom competition of the Vancouver 2010 Olympics was held at Whistler Creekside in Whistler, British Columbia on February 26, 2010.

The race was held in challenging weather conditions of fog, snow, and warm temperatures.  Maria Riesch of Germany won her second gold medal of these Olympics.

Results

References

External links
 2010 Winter Olympics results: Ladies' Slalom (run 1), from vancouver2010.com; retrieved 2010-02-24.
 2010 Winter Olympics results: Ladies' Slalom (run 2), from vancouver2010.com; retrieved 2010-02-24.

Slalom
Winter Olympics